Max Rowley (29 May 1923 - 12 August 1987) was an Australian racing cyclist.

Career highlights

1948
1st and fastest Tour of Gippsland 
3rd in Australian national road race title 
1950
1st in Melbourne to Warrnambool Classic 
3rd in Stage 4 part a Tour of the West 
2nd in Stage 5 part a Tour of the West, Penrith
1st in Stage 5 part b Tour of the West, Sydney 
1st in General Classification Tour of the West
1951 
1st in Stage 1 Tour of the West, Dubbo
1st in Stage 5 Tour of the West, Mudgee 
6th in General Classification Tour of the West 
1952 
3rd in Australian national road race title 
2nd in Stage 5 'Sun' Tour of Victoria 
2nd in General Classification 'Sun' Tour of Victoria

Australian professional cycling career
Rowley won the Blue Riband for the fastest time in the Melbourne to Warrnambool Classic in 1950  and finished 3rd in the Australian national road race title on two occasions, in 1948, over the first  of the Melbourne to Warrnambool Classic  and in 1952 in the championship race at Centennial Park.

Max's brother Keith Rowley was also a successful cyclist, twice winning the Australian national road race title in 1947 and 1950 and winning the blue riband for the fastest time in the Warrnambool in 1947.  Max and Keith finished 1st and fastest and 2nd and 2nd fastest respectively in the 1948 Tour of Gippsland.

References

External links
 

1923 births
Australian male cyclists
1987 deaths
People from Maffra
Cyclists from Victoria (Australia)